Dang Wangi is an area in the city centre of Kuala Lumpur, Malaysia, situated north of Dataran Merdeka, bordering Bukit Nanas and Medan Tuanku and located between the Gombak and Klang Rivers. The name is derived from Hang Jebat's wife. A road that cuts across the ward, Dang Wangi Road, formerly known as Campbell Road, is named after the ward. Running in an east–west orientation, it interchanges into Jalan Tuanku Abdul Rahman on its western end and Jalan Ampang on its eastern end.

The  Dang Wangi LRT Station, part of the KJ Line, is located on the northeast side of the district.

Suburbs in Kuala Lumpur